Villa Rachele is a district in the southern west area of the city of Cinisello Balsamo, in Italy, bordering the Parco Nord in Bresso and bordering Sesto San Giovanni. This area, a slender strip of land, beyond the Viale Fulvio Testi, bordering Sest S.G., Ward Rondinella, a periphery made up of large apartment buildings, car parks, little green, and many clochard and immigrants.

See also
 Cinisello Balsamo
 Crocetta (Cinisello Balsamo)
 SS36

References

Districts of Cinisello Balsamo